The Méouge is a  river in the Auvergne-Rhône-Alpes and Provence-Alpes-Côte d'Azur regions of the south of France. It rises in the Drôme near the town of Séderon and crosses into the Hautes-Alpes at Barret-sur-Méouge where it carves the spectacular tourist attraction, the Gorges de la Méouge, through the limestone platform. Near the communities of Châteauneuf-de-Chabre and Antonaves it joins the river Buëch which in turn flows into the Durance and the Rhône.

Gorges de la Méouge
The lime colored gorge has wild shapes, small sandy beaches, huge polished pebbles, water holes and waterfalls. It is famous for swimming. The medieval bridge of Châteauneuf de Chabre is classified as a historical monument. The gorges are also classified Natural Areas of Ecological Interest, Fauna and Flora whose flora and fauna are protected.

Municipalities and townships crossed 
In both departments of Hautes-Alpes (05) and Drôme (26), the Méouge passes through eleven communities and two cantons. These include : Barret-de-Lioure (source), Séderon, Vers-sur-Méouge, Eygalayes, Lachau, Ballons, Salérans, Barret-sur-Méouge, Saint-Pierre-Avez, Châteauneuf-de-Chabre, Antonaves (confluence).

Tributaries
The Méouge has approximately 30 tributaries :
 the Touissit ravine,
 the Lèbrières ravine,
 the Défens stream,
 the Lioron ravine,
 the Rivadet ravine,
 the Rieu river
 the Villefranche stream with four tributaries
 the Voluy stream with two tributaries
 the Colombier ravine
 the Front-Cold ravine
 the Vignard ravine,
 the Saulce river with a tributary
 the Riançon river with two tributaries
 the Auzance, with two tributaries
 the Mouessoron river
 the Great Combe ravine
 the Couzaut stream with a tributary
 the stream through the Serre,
 the Fontaine Aillaud ravine,
 the Tramier ravine,
 the ravine of salt water,
 the Rif stream with three tributaries
 the Bigarière stream,
 The Fraches stream with a tributary
 the Vines stream
 the d'Ourse stream with a tributary
 the Peysson stream,
 the Rif stream with a tributary
 the Gironde stream,

Hydrology
It covers 14 municipalities and between 1,500 and 2,000 residents, mostly living in the municipalities of the Canton of Ribiers.

References

Rivers of France
Rivers of Drôme
Rivers of Hautes-Alpes
Canyons and gorges of Metropolitan France
Rivers of Provence-Alpes-Côte d'Azur
Rivers of Auvergne-Rhône-Alpes